Marc R. Meyer is an archaeologist and anthropologist who is notable for his excavation of, and research into, the remains of fossil hominids such as Australopithecines and early genus Homo. He currently lectures at Chaffey College, Rancho Cucamonga, CA.

Biography

Doctoral dissertation

Publications
Araiza, I., Meyer, M.R., Williams, S.A., 2021. Is ulna curvature in the StW 573 (‘Little Foot’) Australopithecus natural or pathological? Journal of Human Evolution 151, 102927.
Hermes, T.R., Doumani Dupuy, P.N., Henry, E., Meyer, M.R., Mar’yashev, A.N., Frachetti, M.D. (2021) The multi-period settlement “Dali” in southeastern Kazakhstan: Bronze Age institutional dynamics along the Inner Asian Mountain Corridor. Asian Perspectives (in press).
Williams, S.A. Prang, T.C., Meyer, M.R., Russo, G.A., Shapiro, L.J. (2020) Reevaluating bipedalism in Danuvius. Nature 586, E1-E3.
García-Martínez, D., Bastir, M., Villa, C., García-Río, F., Torres-Sánchez, I., Recheis, W., Barash, A., Khonsari, R.H., O’Higgins, P., Meyer, M.R., Heuzé, Y. (2020) Late subadult ontogeny and adult aging of the human thorax reveals divergent growth trajectories between sexes.  Scientific Reports 10, 10737.
Meyer, M.R., Williams, S.A., Fong, M. (2020) Anatomic extremes of the postcranial axial skeleton of Australopithecus and Paranthropus robustus.  American Journal of Physical Anthropology 171(S69):186.
Jaye, S., Cortez, V., Meyer, M.R., Williams, S.A. (2020) Functional anatomy of the caudalmost sacrum in Australopithecus afarensis, Australopithecus sediba and Homo erectus. American Journal of Physical Anthropology 171(S69):132.
Meyer, M.R., & Williams, S.A. (2019). "The spine of early Pleistocene Homo". In E. Been, A. Gómez-Olivencia, & P. Kramer (Eds.), Spinal Evolution (pp. 153-183). Cham: Springer.
Williams, S.A., & Meyer, M.R. (2019). "The spine of Australopithecus". In E. Been, A. Gómez-Olivencia, & P. Kramer (Eds.), Spinal Evolution (pp. 125-151). Cham: Springer.
Meyer, M.R., & Williams, S.A. (2019). "Earliest axial fossils from the genus Australopithecus". Journal of Human Evolution, 132, 189-214.
Williams, S.A., Prang, T.C., Meyer, M.R., Ostrofsky, K., Nalley, T., et al. (2019). "A nearly complete lower back of Australopithecus sediba". American Journal of Physical Anthropology, 168, 269-270. 
Meyer, M.R. & Williams, S.A. (2019). "4.2 Ma Australopithecus anamensis axial remains: the oldest australopith vertebrae in the fossil record". American Journal of Physical Anthropology 168: 165.
Meyer, M.R., Williams, S.A., García-Martínez, D., Bastir, M. (2018). "Toward Solving the Puzzle of Thorax Shape Variation Among Early Hominins." American Journal of Physical Anthropology 165: 176.

 
 
 

 in 
Meyer, M.R. (2012). "Functional anatomy of the thoracic vertebrae in early Homo." American Journal of Physical Anthropology S(52): 214.

Shearer, B.M. and Meyer, M.R. (2011) Sexual dimorphism in the geometry of the distal humeral condyle. American Journal of Physical Anthropology S(46): 201.
Meyer, M.R. (2008). "Homo_erectus Skeletal indications for distance locomotion in early Homo erectus." American Journal of Physical Anthropology 135(S46): 155.
Chang, M.L. and Meyer, M.R. (2007). "Functional morphology of the Neandertal nose: tracing the evolution of putative adaptive characters in a phylogenetic context." American Journal of Physical Anthropology S(44): 86.
Meyer, M.R., D. Lordkipanidze, et al. (2006). "Language and empathy in Homo erectus: behaviors suggested by a modern spinal cord from Dmanisi, but not Nariokotome." PaleoAnthropology 2006(A): 20.
Meyer, M.R., D. Lordkipanidze, et al. (2006). "The anatomical capacity for spoken language in Homo erectus." American Journal of Physical Anthropology 129(S42): 130.

Meyer, M.R. (2005). "Functional Biology of the Homo erectus axial Skeleton from Dmanisi, Georgia. Doctoral Dissertation in Anthropology. Philadelphia, University of Pennsylvania: 601.

Meyer, M.R., J. Blumenfeld, et al. (2004). "Geographic patterns of nasal morphology in Homo." American Journal of Physical Anthropology 123(S38): 146-147.
Meyer, M.R. (2003). "Vertebrae and language ability in early hominids." PaleoAnthropology 1: 20-21.
Meyer, M.R. (2003) "The evolution of human brain size". IRCS/CCN Brain and Language Series.  Philadelphia Institute of Cognitive Science.
Monge, J.M. and Meyer, M.R. (2002) "A reassessment of human cranial volume using the 19th Century Morton Cranial Collection". IRCS/CCN Brain & Language Series, University of Pennsylvania, Institute for Research in Cognitive Science & Center for Cognitive Neuroscience.

References

American archaeologists
American anthropologists
University of Pennsylvania alumni
Living people
Year of birth missing (living people)